Galinski or Galiński (feminine: Galińska; plural: Galińscy) is a surname. Notable people with the surname include:

 Adam Galinsky (born 1969), American social psychologist
 Edward Galiński (1926-1944), murdered in Auschwitz concentration camp
 Emilia Galińska (born 1992), Polish handball player
 Evelyn Hecht-Galinski (born 1949), German Jewish activist
 Heinz Galinski (1912–1992), German Jewish leader
 Karl Galinsky (born 1942), American Ancient Rome academic
 Marek Galiński (1974–2014), Polish mountain biker
 Marek Galiński (1951–1999), Polish wrestler
 Mary Galinski, professor of medicine
 Michael Galinsky (born 1969), American filmmaker
 Roman Galinski (1905–1974), Polish-American journalist
 Tom Gola (1933–2014), American basketball player and politician, family name Galinsky
 Yaakov Galinsky (1920-2014), rabbi

See also
 
 Galińskie

Polish-language surnames

pl:Galiński